The 1916 college football season had no very clear cut champion, with the Official NCAA Division I Football Records Book listing Army and Pittsburgh as national champions. Only Pittsburgh claims a national championship for the 1916 season. Georgetown led the nation in scoring with 464 points.

Conference changes
Two conferences began play in 1916:
 Pacific Coast Conference – a precursor to the modern Pac-12 Conference; four founding members from California, Oregon, and Washington.
 Nebraska Intercollegiate Conference – an NAIA conference active through the 1976 season
One conference played its final season in 1916:
 Kentucky Intercollegiate Athletic Association – active since the 1914 season; several members subsequently joined the Kentucky Intercollegiate Athletic Conference, an active NAIA conference now known as the River States Conference

Membership changes

Large scores
Georgia Tech defeated Cumberland 222 to 0. Sewanee also beat Cumberland 107 to 0.

Rose Bowl
Oregon defeated Penn, 14–0, in the 1917 Rose Bowl.

Conference standings

Major conference standings

Independents

Minor conferences

Minor conference standings

Awards and honors

All-Americans

The consensus All-America team included:

Statistical leaders
 Team scoring most points: Georgetown, 464 to 32. (including mid majors, Tulsa  566 to 40)
 Player scoring most points: Johnny Gilroy, Georgetown, 160

References